Menorah in flames is a sculpture created in 1997 by Nandor Glid as a Holocaust memorial commemorating deportation of the Thessaloniki Jews.

The sculpture, initially built in a suburban area  has been installed since 2006 on Eleftherias Square where a major roundup of 9,000 Jewish men took place in 1942.

It was the first Holocaust memorial to be built on a public space in Greece and its installation marks a change of attitude of Greek officials towards the remembrance of the Holocaust. The monument is regularly vandalized.

References 

Holocaust memorials
The Holocaust in Greece
Culture in Thessaloniki
1997 sculptures
Monuments and memorials in Greece
Jews and Judaism in Thessaloniki